Bartolomé Caldentey (born 25 April 1951) is a retired Spanish cyclist. He won two silver medals at the UCI Motor-paced World Championships in 1976 and 1977. He finished in third place in 1980 but was disqualified for failing a doping test.

References

1951 births
Living people
Spanish male cyclists
Sportspeople from Mallorca
Cyclists from the Balearic Islands
20th-century Spanish people
21st-century Spanish people